Livsey is a surname. Notable people with the surname include:

Billy Livsey, American songwriter, keyboardist, and producer from Nashville, Tennessee
Richard Livsey, Baron Livsey of Talgarth CBE (1935–2010), British politician and Liberal MP
Walter Livsey (1893–1978), English cricketer for Hampshire
Wesley Livsey Jones (1863–1932), American politician
William J. Livsey, retired United States Army four-star general